Meteorite Mountain is a prominent  glaciated mountain summit located in the Chugach Mountains, in the U.S. state of Alaska. In January 1927, a meteorite hit this mountain, which is how the mountain got its name. The mountain's name was in local use when it was first published in 1953 by U.S. Geological Survey. Precipitation runoff and meltwater from the mountain's glaciers drains into tributaries of the Lowe River, which in turn empties to Prince William Sound.

Climate

Based on the Köppen climate classification, Meteorite Mountain is located in a subarctic climate zone with long, cold, snowy winters, and cool summers. Weather systems coming off the Gulf of Alaska are forced upwards by the Chugach Mountains (orographic lift), causing heavy precipitation in the form of rainfall and snowfall. Temperatures can drop below −20 °C with wind chill factors below −30 °C. The months May through June offer the most favorable weather for viewing and climbing.

See also

List of mountain peaks of Alaska
Geography of Alaska

References

Gallery

External links
 Weather forecast: Mountain-Forecast.com
 The meteor story, valdezalaska.org

Mountains of Alaska
Landforms of Chugach Census Area, Alaska
North American 2000 m summits